Das Boot (English: (The Boat) is the title of a 603-page 1973 German novel by Lothar-Günther Buchheim (1918-2007), which deals with the author's personal experiences recorded as a war correspondent on U-boat submarines. Buchheim recorded his time on submarine U-96 and submarine U-309 during World War II. The Buchheim historical drama book was published in 1973 by Piper Verlag, the book has sold millions of copies and was translated into 18 languages. The novel portrayed the harsh and difficult submarine warfare life on a German submarine.

Buchheim
Buchheim was a painter, author, and war correspondent for the Nazi Germany's Kriegsmarine. Buchheim was employed by the Nazi propaganda company, Propagandakompanie (PK). As part of his work, Buchheim was a "guest" on board Kriegsmarine ships and submarines. The novel is based on Buchheim's six weeks of experiences on several U-boat trips. Buchheim also wrote the books: The Fortress and The Farewell in which he used also fictional names. In Das Boot, the main character is the commander, who is modeled after commander Heinrich Lehmann-Willenbrock (1911-1986) of U-96, a Type VIIC U-boat. Willenbrock was given the nickname "the Old Man" and Herr Kaleun. In Das Boot the other officers are unnamed and referred to by their job on the submarine. One ensign is named Ullmann and two noncommissioned officers are named. Buchheim refers to himself as Herr Leutnant as the narrator, but not given a submarine job. In the book, the submarine is only referred to as the fictional UA. Other submarines are given fictional names also like: UF, UX or UY. Places and dates are also not used in the book also. So while the book is in part a record of Buchheim time, much of the book is fictional.  Buchheim died in 2007 at the age of 89. Buchheim wrote a short story about his experiences in the 1960s, before he wrote Das Boot, the short story was called Die Eichenlaubfahrt, (or Oak Leaves Patrol). Heinrich Lehmann-Willenbrock was awarded the Knight's Cross with oak leaves, thus the title of the short story. In 1976 Buchheim released the book U-Boot-Krieg (U-Boat War), a story of his trip on U-96 and U-309. U-Boot-Krieg including 200 photographs Buchheim took on the trips.

Book

Das Boot starts with the celebrations of the U-boat officers on land. The officers are enjoying life before leaving port. The crew are in a bar, Bar Royal, in northern France, near a base of the Kriegsmarine Organization. The officers talk about the dangers, Führer der Unterseeboote (leader of the U-boats), Befehlshaber der U-Boote (Commander-in-Chief of the U-boats), and Admiral Karl Dönitz. The officers talk about a U-boat hang out, a real place, the Hotel Majestic near the Saint-Nazaire submarine base. Live on the U-Boat is discussed: rules, dress code, drinking, and tight confines the submarine with 50 men. The base was under air raid attack as they depart.  Das Boot described life on aboard in storms, idleness, attacks on ships, moral dilemmas to rescue or not and hours of destroyer depth charge. The submarine is damaged and needs to return to port, but at ordered to pass the dangerous Strait of Gibraltar and operate in the Mediterranean Sea. The submarine is attacked and damaged in the Strait. The submarine drives to the bottom and works to repair the submarine. The repairs get the submarine off the bottom and she makes it to La Rochelle, France a German-occupied port. But at La Rochelle the submarine is sunk in air raid with some of the crew lost.

Feedback and reception
Being a fictional novel based on real experiences, the original 1973 book has mixed reception and reviews. The book is a fictionalized autobiographical story. 

The portrayal of the submarine crew upset  some German U-Boat veterans’ groups.

Buchheim writes about the specs of the U-Boat and then has it drive deeper than it can in the book.

written differently, thought differently, must not change such a judgement: Lothar-Günther Buchheim has written the best German novel from the front of the Second World War to date, the first that is valid, and objections that the war, Either way, it's no longer an issue, have been wiped off the desk, and off the beer table too. – Peter Dubrow: Die Zeit, October 12, 1973

In Buchheim, the submarine crew is no longer the hero. The boat, on the other hand, almost becomes a hero, which, as the whale Melville described in an almost erotic and affectionate way, becomes an almost mythical object – a "dark ferry on oily-black slick, as it glides out of the submarine bunker on enemy voyages. German Werth: Der Tagesspiegel October 7, 1973

Translations
The Novel Das Boot was translated into British English for a United Kingdom edition. The United Kingdom edition was translated by John Brownjohn and was originally published by HarperCollins in 1974.

In the United States the book was published by Alfred A. Knopf with 463 pages. Das Boot was translated into American English by translated by Denver and Helen Lindley in 1975 with editor-translator Carol Brown Janeway (1944–2015).

De Boot a Dutch translation was published in 1974 by in den Toren with 557 pages.

Das Boot has been translated into 18 languages.

1981 film

The book was turned into a 1981 West German war film written and directed by Wolfgang Petersen and produced by Günter Rohrbach. The 1981 film starred Jürgen Prochnow, Herbert Grönemeyer, and Klaus Wennemann. The film had been shown as in theatrical release and a TV miniseries in 1985. The film as been released in home video and a director's cut by Petersen in 1997. As with many books turning into movies, the film makes some changes from the novel.

Die FestungDie Festung (The Fortress) is a 1469 page novel by Lothar-Günther Buchheim the sequel to his book Das Boot. Die Festung was published in 1995 by Verlag Hoffmann und Campe, a fictional novel based on real experiences. The book is about Buchheim 's experiences as a naval war correspondent shortly before and after the Allied invasion of France on D-day that started on June 6, 1944. The story starts with Buchheim U-96 arriving at Saint-Nazaire at the end of Buchheim's second patrol U-96. Arriving he was told to report to Berlin's Minister of Propaganda Joseph Goebbels. He hear that Heinrich Lehmann-Willenbrock had been appointed commander of the 9th U-boat Flotilla in Brest, France. After arriving in Berlin he learns, his publisher Peter Suhrkamp had been arrested by the Gestapo. Buchheim's U-Boat is approved by Jäger im Weltmeer. Buchheim is also commissioned to paint Admiral Karl Dönitz and his submarine aces. Before completing the painting he is ordered back to France via Berlin. In France Buchheim see the beginning of the invasion in Paris in August 1944. From Paris Buchheim is ordered to the invasion front and sees the heavy losses of the Wehrmacht.  He departs Brest and meets up with Lehmann-Willenbroc and heads out on U-Boat patrol in the Atlantic. Lehmann-Willenbrock tells Buchheim former girlfriend Simone Sagot was kidnapped by the Sicherheitsdienst, Security Service of the Reichsführer-SS. 
The United States Army had off Brest as U-Boat still dangerously enters and departed the Brest harbor. All U-Boat at Brest are ordered to used the base at La Pallice-La_Rochelle. Buchheim departs with Lehmann-Willenbrock in U-730 a snorkel submarine that travels underwater in the daytime. After arriving at La Pallice, by car, he drives across France to look for Simone with a senior boatswain and a taciturn driver. The car narrowly escapes the advancing Allies. Near Paris, Buchheim finds Simone has been deported to the Ravensbrück concentration camp, he has missed her by a few days. DeArriving in Alsace France near the border, Buchheim updates the staff of the Naval Group Command West (Marinegruppenkommando West), who had fled there from Saverne. The book ends when he turns his Maschinenpistole pistol on the attending command staff and collapses. Parts of the book were used in the Das Boot (TV series), a German television series sequel to the 1981 film.Gekillt, die armen Schweine Bericht über die Entstehung in: Der Spiegel, April 17, 1995

U-Boot KriegU-Boot Krieg (Submarine Warfare or U-Boat War) is a novel installment of Buchheim with a photo essay, published in 1978 by Piper Verlag. The German language book has 300 pages and included 200 black and white photos. The photos were taken on U-96 and some on U-309, while Buchheim was a war correspondent. The book also includes U-Boat technical data and records of Buchheim time on the U-Boats. The English edition was translated by Gudie Lawaetz and published by Knopf. The  English edition included an essay by Michael Salewski.U-Boot Krieg, New York, Knopf, distributed by Random House, 1978, 325 pages, 
ISBN 0394414373

Der AbschiedDer Abschied (Farewell) is a novel by Buchheim published in 2000. It is the third part of the trilogy that began with Das Boot in 1973 and continued with Die Festung in 1995. The historical fictional drama book is about Buchheim traveling from Rotterdam to Durban on Germany's nuclear research vessel, Otto Hahn. The vessel is commanded by Lehmann-Willenbrock from U-96. The book has long dialogue between Buchheim and Willenbrock, some of the dialogue continues from the book Die Festung. Simone, Buchheim's French girlfriend, is talked about, and other matters of the good old days. As with his other books, Buchheim covers naval technology of German submarines and the Otto Hahn. A 560-page English edition was released in 2005 by Piper. Der Abschied, ASIN: B017RCVP4I, Edition language: English

Buchheim, Simone - Diethild 

The Buchheim books, Simone is Buchheim's French girlfriend, he finds her and she becomes his wife. In real life, Buchheim married, Diethild Buchheim, née Diethild Wickboldt''', born July 19, 1922, in Mecklenburg, Germany. Diethild Buchheim died on March 8, 2014, in Tutzing, Germany. Diethild Buchheim was a German bookseller in Mecklenburg. The two met in 1950 at the Leipzig Book Fair and the two were married in 1955. Diethild Buchheim was the chairwoman of the Buchheim Foundation.  

 See also 

 Submarine films
 Battle of the Atlantic (1939–1945)
 , 1941 propaganda film
 , 1958 anti-war film
 Sharks and Little Fish''
 "Das Boot" (song), title theme to the film, composed and produced by Klaus Doldinger; 1991 covered by U96
 Das Boot (TV series), a German television series sequel to the 1981 film
 Das Boot (album), a 1992 album by U96 from 1992
 Das Boot (video game), a 1991 video game inspired by the novel

References

External links 

 
Photo of Lothar-Günther Buchheim in 1941 on U-Boat
Photo of Lothar-Günther Buchheim in 2006
youtube.com Das Boot TV - Trailer
youtube.com Das Boot film - Trailer
youtube.com History vs the movie 'Das Boot'

U-boat fiction 
German Type VIIC submarines
Novels about submarine warfare
Novels adapted into video games